The 2020 Bangabandhu National Football Championship, also known as 2020 Walton National Football Championship (due to sponsorship reason from Walton Group), is the sixth edition of the National Football Championship, the premier competition in Bangladesh for teams representing districts and government institutions. It is organized and hosted by the Bangladesh Football Federation. A total of 78 participants nation-wide will participate in the tournament. The format of the tournament changed in this edition as it is no more a top division league and resuming after 13 years.     

Dhaka Mohammedan are the defending champions by won 2–0 against Dhaka Abahani on 8 January 2006.

Format
Along with 63 districts football teams excluding only Kishoreganj, three service teams, six public universities, five education boards, and Bangladesh Krira Shikkha Protishthan will participate in the tournament. The participants districts have been divided in eight zones named Padma, Meghna, Jamuna, Shitalakshya, Brahmaputra, Surma, Chitra and Buriganga. Each zone consists eight teams except Surma, which contains seven teams. There will be knockout matches in every zone which will be played on home and away basis. In first round, a pair of teams of every zone will play each other which will decide four winners. In second round, that four winners in each zone will play zonal semifinal. In third round, the semi-final winners will face each other in zonal final. The champion from each zone will qualify for the final round. 

Teams representing education boards, universities & the services teams—a total of 15 teams—are divided in four groups in Sheba zone. The teams of this zone will play on round-robin basis. Champion and runners-up of Sheba zone will join eight zonal champions in the final round.

Championship round
In the championship round ten teams will contest: the eight winner teams from eight zones and two services teams.

Qualified teams
 Bangladesh Army
 BKSP
 Comilla District
 Cox's Bazar District
 Khulna District
 Netrokona District
 Pabna District
 Rangpur District
 Satkhira District
 Sylhet District

Sponsorship
The title sponsor of 2020 Bangabandhu National Football Championship is Walton Group.

References

1